The Apostolic Vicariate of Pakse is a Latin rite missionary territorial jurisdiction of the Catholic Church in Laos. As an apostolic vicariate, it is a pre-diocesan jurisdiction, entitled to a titular bishop. It covers southern Laos.

It is exempt, i.e., not part of any ecclesiastical province but directly dependent on the Holy See and notably its missionary Roman Congregation for the Evangelization of Peoples.

Its cathedral episcopal see is Cathedral of the Sacred Heart, in Pakse.

History 
The vicariate was established on 12 June 1967 as Apostolic Vicariate of Pakse / Paksé (French) / 巴色 (正體中文) / Paksen(sis) (Latin adjective), when it was split off from the Apostolic Vicariate of Savannakhet.

Statistics and extent 
The vicariate covers the Laotian provinces of Champasak, Salavan, Xekong and Attapu, but most of the Catholics live in Champasak and Saravan.

Covering an area of 45,000 km² of southern Laos, the Vicariate is the smallest of the apostolic vicariates in Laos. As of 2016, only about 15,000 (1.3%) of approximately 1.3 million people living in the area are members of the Catholic Church, half of them belonging to ethnic minorities. It is subdivided into 46 parishes served by only 7 priests. There are also 19 sisters from the Soeurs de la Charite (Sisters of Charity) and the Filles Marie de la Croix (Daughters of Mary of the Cross). As per 2014 it has 7 priests (6 diocesan, 1 religious), 22 lay religious (10 brothers, 12 sisters) and 16 seminarians.

Ordinaries

Apostolic Vicars of Pakse
 Jean-Pierre Urkia, M.E.P. (1967–1975)
 Thomas Khamphan (1975–2000)
 Cardinal Louis-Marie Ling Mangkhanekhoun, I.V.D. (2000–2017), appointed Apostolic Vicar of Vientiane
 Andrew Souksavath Nouane Asa (since 2022)

See also 
 List of Catholic dioceses in Laos

References

External links 
 GCatholic, with Google photo – data for all sections
 Catholic Hierarchy 

Champasak Province
Apostolic vicariates
Roman Catholic dioceses in Laos
Religious organizations established in 1967
Roman Catholic dioceses and prelatures established in the 20th century